Roman Grynberg is a Polish-born professor of economics, author and academic at the University of Namibia's Faculty of Economic and Management Sciences. He has written economics papers on SACU and is specialised in international trade and commodities, and has written several research papers in the disciplines. He is also a regular columnist for The Namibian and has written for the Mail & Guardian on macroeconomic concepts.

Career
Grynberg has taught Economics at different universities across the world including in Papua New Guinea at the  University of Papua New Guinea, University of the South Pacific in Asia and Botswana. He lives in Windhoek, Namibia.

References

Academic staff of the University of Namibia
Living people
Year of birth missing (living people)